Biały Kamień, formerly an independent city, is a residential district and administrative unit located in the western part of Wałbrzych. It is best known for having the oldest record of coal mining in the Wałbrzych region, dated 1561, and for being the home of the football club Zagłębie Wałbrzych.

References

Wałbrzych
Cities and towns in Lower Silesian Voivodeship
Wałbrzych County
Former populated places in Lower Silesian Voivodeship